Lawrence Edward Moten (born March 25, 1972) is an American retired professional basketball player.

Moten attended Archbishop Carroll High School in Washington, D.C. and the New Hampton School in New Hampton, New Hampshire before playing his college ball at Syracuse University. Playing as a guard/forward, he is the career scoring leader for that school with 2,334 points and graduated as the Big East Conference's all-time leading scorer with 1,405 points, ahead of Troy Bell (BC – 1,388 pts), Terry Dehere (SHU – 1,320 pts), and Chris Mullin (SJU – 1,290 pts). Moten averaged 19.3 ppg, 4.9 rpg and 2.4 apg over his four-year collegiate career – scoring in double figures in 118 of 121 games. He is the only player to score 500 or more points in four consecutive seasons in Syracuse history and was the first player since Hall of Famer Dave Bing to lead Syracuse in scoring for three straight seasons.

He was selected by the Vancouver Grizzlies in the 2nd round (36th overall pick) of the 1995 NBA draft. He played for the Grizzlies for two seasons from 1995–1997 and for the Washington Wizards during the 1997–98 season. After his NBA career, he played in the CBA and ABA, and in Spain and Venezuela. Moten later became the vice president of player development for the Maryland Nighthawks of the ABA.  He was the head coach of the Rochester Razorsharks in 2014 and led them to their 4th PBL title.

Moten, as of 2019, works with middle school youth in central New York.

References

External links

College & NBA stats @ basketballreference.com

1972 births
Living people
African-American basketball players
All-American college men's basketball players
American expatriate basketball people in Canada
American expatriate basketball people in Greece
American expatriate basketball people in Spain
American expatriate basketball people in Venezuela
American men's basketball players
ABA All-Star Game players
Basketball players from Washington, D.C.
Idaho Stampede (CBA) players
La Crosse Bobcats players
Mobile Revelers players
Papagou B.C. players
Shooting guards
Small forwards
Syracuse Orange men's basketball players
Vancouver Grizzlies draft picks
Vancouver Grizzlies players
Washington Wizards players
Archbishop Carroll High School (Washington, D.C.) alumni
21st-century African-American sportspeople
20th-century African-American sportspeople
New Hampton School alumni